Stronghold: Warlords is a real-time strategy game released in March 9, 2021, developed and published by Firefly Studios. Unlike the previous entries of the Stronghold series, which were focused Europe during the Middle Ages, Stronghold: Warlords is set in East Asia, with campaigns based on historical events of China, Vietnam, and Japan.

Gameplay 
One of the key differences in gameplay compared to the previous games is the introduction of warlords, 8 neutral AI-controlled lords who each have different benefits available after subjugation by either military force or diplomacy. After coming under the player, the warlords can provide shipments of resources, provide forces, attack an enemy lord on command or rank up, by expending diplomacy points. Diplomacy points can be accrued over time, which is sped up by constructing some new buildings introduced in this game. This is also the first game in the series to have introduced gunpowder.

Release and reception 

The game was announced at E3 2019, with a release date of September 29, 2020, but was delayed til January 9, 2021 due to the COVID-19 pandemic, and finally released at March 9, 2021, after further delays due to problems in the game's multiplayer mode.

The game received "mixed" reviews according to the review aggregation website Metacritic.

External links 
 Stronghold: Warlords Official Website

References 

2021 video games
Multiplayer and single-player video games
Real-time strategy video games
Stronghold (series)
Video games developed in the United Kingdom
Video games set in China
Video games set in Japan
Video games set in Vietnam
Windows games
Windows-only games